Tazing Dong (), officially known as Bijay, is a mountain in Bangladesh. Officially, it is the highest mountain in Bangladesh. It is located on Saichol Mountain ranges, Ruma Upazila of Bandarban District, southeast of Bangladesh.

Etymology 
In local dialect, "Tazing" means big or highest, and "Dong" means mountain or peak. So "Tazing Dong" means "the highest mountain". The mountain is officially named Bijay Mountain.

Location 
Tazing Dong is in the Saichol Mountain range, Remakri Union, Ruma Upazila, Bandarban District, in Bangladesh. There is a tribal village near this peak.

See also 
 Keokradong
 Saka Haphong

References

External links 
 Tazing Dong (Bijay) Mountain in Bangladesh National Portal
 Tazing Dong (Bijay) Peak Travel Mate BD

Mountains of Bangladesh
Bandarban District